Happu Ki Ultan Paltan is an Indian Hindi-language sitcom television series that premiered on 4 March 2019 on &TV. Produced under Edit II productions, it is a spin-off of Bhabiji Ghar Par Hain!. Apart from the character Happu Singh, the show features his mother, wife and nine children.

Plot 
Happu Singh is a police officer in the city of Kanpur. The story revolves around the misadventures of Happu Singh and his large family- consisting of his wife; Rajesh Singh, mother Katori and his nine children. He is constantly troubled by the rivalry between his wife and mother and the antics of his best friend; Beni and his nine children who are Katori 'Kat', Mallai ‘Mallaika’, Ranbir, Hritik, Chamchi, Ayushman and three other kids who are infant.

Cast 
 Yogesh Tripathi as Inspector Happu Singh (2019–present), an incompetent police officer living in Kanpur with his wife, mother and nine children. His childhood best friend is an incompetent lawyer enamoured with his sister-in-law Bimlesh. He is constantly troubled by having to deal with the rivalry between his wife and mother. He is always bribing others for money.
 Kamna Pathak as Mrs. Rajesh Happu Singh (2019–present). She is Happu's level-headed wife and is often the voice of reason in the household. She is an excellent singer and actress, but opted to be Happu's wife. She is at constant odds with her mother-in-law, Katori but respects and cares for her. She always makes her husband in doing things she wants. She has a friend Karishma and sister Bimlesh 
 Himani Shivpuri as Katori Devi Singh (2019–present). She is Happu's mother and Rajesh's mother-in-law. She is at constant odds with her daughter-in-law and tries to outdo her at things like acting and singing. She has a drinking habit and is a domineering woman who can see and interact with the spirit of her dead husband. She is always first to taunt Rajesh, she loves her son very much and granddaughter Chamchi but even helps her daughter in law at times.
 Sanjay Choudhary as Kamlesh (2019–present). He is the happy-go-lucky friend of Happu's eldest daughter, Katori. He is at constant odds with Malaika, Happu's second daughter and ingratiated her and everyone around him with his heavily accented, broken English. He is often thrashed and somehwhat playfully bullied by Malaika when he gets on her nerves. He tries unsuccessfully to get Malaika to acknowledge and respect him and his relationship with Kat.
 Ashna Kishore as Katori Singh "Kat" (2019–2022). She is Happu's eldest daughter and Kamlesh's friend. She is named after her paternal grandmother. She is a ditsy, yet sweet and happy-go-lucky girl who tries to speak in English. However, she struggles to speak it fluently and earns the ire of people around her who can't understand what she is saying.
 Gazal Sood ( 2023-present),replaced Ashna Kishore 
 Zahara Sethjiwala as Malaika Singh (2019–2021). She is Happu's second-eldest daughter. She is a tomboy and a disciplinarian by nature. A hard-working and fair-minded person, she aspires to become a police officer for the Haryana State Police. She is often vexed by the antics of her elder sister and her friend - who she dismisses as a nuisance but also playfully bullies Kamlesh. She is one of the few level minded people in the Singh household.
 Jasneet Kaur Kant as Malaika Singh (2021–2022), replaced Zahara Sethjiwala. 
 Sonal Panwar as Malaika Singh (2022–present), replaced Jasneet Kaur Kant.
 Vishwanath Chatterjee as Beni Prasad Singh (2019–present). He is Happu's childhood friend and neighbour. He is a lawyer by profession and an excellent cook. He is often dragged into the antics of Happu's household and can be bribed with the promise of marrying Bimlesh - Rajesh's younger sister. He is hopelessly in love with Bimlesh - who possibly doesn't acknowledge his feelings.
 Sapna Sikawar (2021–present) as Bimlesh Prasad Singh; Beni's wife, Rajesh's sister, Happu's sister-in-law. 
Aryan Prajapati as Hritik Singh (2019–present). He is Happu's fifth child and third boy who is very mischievous by nature. He is very attached to his mother and often takes his mother's side in the rivalry between her and his grandmother but for his own deeds.
 Zaara Warsi as Chamchi Singh (2019–present). She is Happu's youngest daughter. She is mischievous like her brother, Hritik and takes the side of her grandmother in the rivalry between her and her mother, Rajesh. She is very attached to her grandmother and often takes advantage of her love.
 Sharad Vyas as Khodi Lal Singh (2019–present). He is Happu Singh's deceased father who lives in the house as a spirit who can only be seen by his wife Katori but is acknowledged by the entire family. He hopes to have Katori join him as he misses her but she dismisses it and they laugh it off. Kodhi Lal is happy-go-lucky and sweet and doesn't approve of the rivalry between his wife and his daughter-in-law.
 Somya Azad as Ranbir Singh (2019–present). He is Happu's eldest son and third child. He is terrible at his studies, like his father, and often slacks off with his studies to the annoyance of his parents. He aspires to be a singer. He gets into trouble often for being unable to read the atmosphere and singing at inappropriate moments.
 Kishore Bhanushali as Police Commissioner Resham Pal Singh (2019–present).
 Arnav Tata as Ayushmaan Singh (2019–present) Happu's second son and fourth child. He is a studious and intelligent person. He is always found studying with books and his weird way of talking irritates his family.
 Jeetu Gupta as Doctor Gupta
 Rajeev Mehra as Makmal Makhwana, commissioner turned constable at police station.
 Nitin Jhadav as Manohar. He is a constable at the police station where Happu is an inspector and always irritates him.
 Vijay Kumar Singh as Master Bhoop Singh, he reprises his role from  Bhabiji Ghar Par Hain!,Chamchi; Hritik and Ranbir's teacher.
Charul Malik as Rusa (2021–present) The Commissioner's sister in law.
 Sohit Soni as Raj & various character

Production

Development
Initially titled Happu Ke Chappu, it was later changed to Happu Ki Ultan Paltan.

Talking about the series, producer Sanjay Kohli said, "Happu Singh has been a favorite among viewers ever since the inception of the character in the hugely popular Bhabiji Ghar Par Hai. This huge fan following for Happu encouraged us to come up with a show revolving around his life at home and it’s sure to entertain the audience. Happu Ki Ultan Paltan will capture the hilarious situations that will take place in Happu’s home with his dabang wife, nagging mother and his nine pesky kids, with helpless Happu in the centre of all their madness. We are positive that viewers will love this show and laugh along".

References

External links 
 
 Happu Ki Ultan Paltan on ZEE5

2019 Indian television series debuts
&TV original programming
Hindi-language television shows
Indian television sitcoms
Indian television spin-offs